One Piece Film: Z is a 2012 Japanese anime fantasy action adventure film directed by Tatsuya Nagamine. It is the twelfth feature film based on the shōnen manga series One Piece by Eiichiro Oda. The film stars the regular television cast of Mayumi Tanaka, Kazuya Nakai, Akemi Okamura, Kappei Yamaguchi, Hiroaki Hirata, Ikue Otani, Yuriko Yamaguchi, Kazuki Yao, and Chō. It also features Hōchū Ōtsuka as Zephyr, an ex-naval Admiral, with Ryoko Shinohara and Teruyuki Kagawa as Zephyr's henchmen Ain and Benz respectively. The events of the film takes place near the end of the fifteenth season of the One Piece anime series during the "Z's Ambition" story arc, which serves as a prologue. The film revolves around the Straw Hat Pirates battling against Zephyr, considered to be the most powerful enemy they've faced yet.

Plot
While there, Zephyr steals the Dyna Stones and fights Kizaru and the marines before he starts an eruption to defeat the Admiral only to be sent flying into the ocean. 

While having a cherry blossom party, the Straw Hat Pirates discover an unconscious Zephyr floating on the sea. Luffy uses his gum-gum devil fruit ability to reel him in, but when grabbing Zephyr’s prosthetic arm (the battle smasher) Luffy loses all his strength. The Straw hats soon learn that Zephyr’s arm is made with sea prism stones. As Chopper begins to attend to Zephyr’s wounds, Nami begins to worry, not just because of the prosthetic arm, but also because of Zephyr’s muscular form and his many battle scars, but Luffy reassures Nami that if Zephyr is a threat he will deal with him. When Zephyr comes too, everything is fine at first as Luffy and Zephyr begin socializing, but when Zephyr learns that Monkey D. Luffy is a pirate, he fights Luffy, Roronoa Zoro and Sanji. 

Having discovered Zephyr's location with a Vivre Card, Ain and Binz join the ex-Admiral to fight them. Ain uses her Devil Fruit powers to de-age Nami, Tony Tony Chopper, Brook and Nico Robin, while Binz uses his Devil Fruit powers to trap Franky, Usopp and Brook with vines.
Luffy goes one on one against Zephyr, but is overpowered and defeated when Zephyr grabs Luffy with his Battle Smasher arm. Realizing that Luffy is the grandson of Monkey D. Garp, Zephyr attempts to kill them, but the Straw Hats are forced to flee. At Marine Headquarters, the navy discovers Zephyr's whereabouts and decides to recover the Dyna Stones. Landing on Dock Island, Franky repairs the Thousand Sunny, which has been damaged by Zephyr. 

They meet , whose granddaughter reveals that pirates who come to this island say that they have been attacked by Zephyr. Mobston, angered by Zephyr destroying their pirates' dreams, decides to give the Straw Hats his strongest equipment. While there, the Straw Hats gather information on Zephyr's location from the navy and meet up with Kuzan, who reveals that has left the navy after being defeated by Akainu on Punk Hazard. Using the Sea Train, the Straw Hats enter Secon Island just as the volcano erupts. They confront Zephyr, Ain and Binz, only to be easily defeated once again. Meanwhile, Garp reveals to Koby and Helmeppo that Zephyr once believed in the navy's justice and became an Admiral after serving as a soldier in the navy. 

When Zephyr's wife and son were killed by a pirate who resented him, Zephyr became an instructor. One day, most of Zephyr's recruits were killed and Zephyr lost his arm after being attacked by a pirate with Devil Fruit powers. Zephyr acquired his prosthetic arm the Battle Smasher, a weapon developed by the navy's scientist to defeat Devil Fruit users and organized a strike unit. However, when the pirate who attacked him was chosen to serve as a Warlord, Zephyr left the Navy, organizing the Neo Marines as a result. Back on Dock Island, Kuzan reveals that Zephyr is targeting the three volcanic islands known as End Points. If all three islands erupt in a short period of time of each other, it would result in a giant eruption covering the New World's oceans and killing everyone in them. The Straw Hats confront the Neo Marines on the third End Point and have a massive battle. 

Luffy finds Zephyr and challenges him one to one. As the Straw Hats battle against the Neo Marines and a bunch of converted Pacifista’s, Zoro and Sanji go head to head against Ain and Binz. The Straw Hats are victorious, and with Ain defeated, Nami, Chopper, Robin and Brook return to their original age. Luffy and Zephyr’s fight wages on with Zephyr using his Battle Smasher to get the upper hand. Luffy, using all his might continues to punch Zephyr’s Battle Smasher until he breaks it. Zephyr removes the Battle Smasher and fights Luffy with only the usage of Haki. The two are still equally matched and in the final strike, they both knock the other one down. Zephyr admits defeat and believes that Luffy will now kill him (for he believes all pirates are the same), but Luffy spares Zephyr and says he doesn’t want to kill anyone. 

Seeing how Luffy is different from other pirates Zephyr realizes the errors of his ways and understood that his actions were driven by anger, he apologizes to Ain and Binz for all that he has done and asks for their forgiveness. In that moment, Kizaru and the navy appear and choose to execute Zephyr and the Neo Marines, as well as the Straw Hat Pirates whiles they’re all weak from their previous battle. The Straw Hats prepare themselves for battle, but Zephyr walks forward, stating that he has done everything he wanted to do and now he will pay the price for his actions. Just then a wall of ice appears and separates Zephyr from the others, thus giving the Straw Hats, Ain and Binz the chance to escape, whiles leaving Zephyr to fight back against the marines. 

As the Straw Hats sail away, Zephyr battles against the marines until he succumbs to his injuries and died. Ain and Binz mourn their loss, as they cry over a makeshift grave that used Zephyr’s Battle Smasher as the centerpiece. Kuzan tells them not to cry and states "Hee lived his life the way he wanted. Don’t you think he was amazing.” In the aftermath, a young Zephyr dresses himself as a superhero fighting off a group of bullies, who were harassing a girl. Zephyr beats the bullies with ease and as the bullies escapes, Zephyr states that he is the “Hero of Justice” as shouts the word “I’m Z”

In a mid-credit scene, the Straw Hats return to Dock Island, giving their gear and weapons back to Mobston, before going their separate ways.

Voice cast

Development and production
In November 2011, Fuji Television announced that production on One Piece Film: Z has begun. One month later, Viz Media's Shonen Jump and Hisashi Suzuki, deputy director of Shueisha's Shonen manga group announced through their Twitter accounts that Eiichiro Oda would be the executive producer for the film. On January 30, 2012, Toei issued a press release announcing the film's plot and also announced the film's director Tatsuya Nagamine and the film's release in December.

The April 23, 2012 issue of Weekly Shonen Jump revealed character designs for Zephyr and also revealed minor information, including staff information as well as the premiere date, December 15. The screenplay was written by Osamu Suzuki, who serves as one of the writers of the television program SMAP x SMAP, and the film's character designer and animation supervisor is Masayuki Sato, who was previously involved as an animation supervisor and character designer of One Piece Film: Strong World.

Promotion
On April 21, 2012, Toei's official website for the One Piece films was updated with a teaser trailer.

A special pre-sale collaboration ticket with the Dragon Ball Z: Battle of Gods movie was made to commemorate the release of the two films. The dual-ticket good for both films has a special new illustration by both Akira Toriyama (author of Dragon Ball) and Eiichirō Oda. Limited to 8,989 across Japan, the tickets went on sale on November 23, 2012 for ¥2,600 ($31.51 US) apiece.

Music
The film's theme songs are covers of Nickelback's "How You Remind Me" and Joan Jett's "Bad Reputation", both performed by Canadian singer Avril Lavigne. Oda sent a personal thank you letter to Lavigne after hearing her cover of "How You Remind Me". "Bad Reputation" is one of Oda's favorite songs. Lavigne agreed to contribute the songs for the film. The film's soundtrack, containing 30 tracks, was released on December 12, 2012 by Sony Music Entertainment Japan.

Release

Box office
One Piece Film: Z opened at number one in the Japanese box office, earning  (US$16.3 million) during its opening weekend. Film attendees received 1 of 2 million copies of an 84-page “Volume 1,000” of One Piece, which contains designs about Character Z (also known as Zephyr) and an exclusive One Piece Treasure World card. The film grossed  in Japan

The movie was released across several other Asian countries including Taiwan, Hong Kong, Singapore, Philippines, Thailand, and South Korea. A French dub was released for One Pieces "Straw Hat Day" on May 15, 2013.

Critical response
Toshi Nakamura, writing for Kotaku, called Z "something [he] was totally not expecting." Nakamura particularly praised the film's villain, calling its backstory "dramatic, and more importantly, convincing," as well as the pacing of the storyline, saying that it feels "organic." However, Nakamura had mixed opinions of the film's secondary characters, stating that "some of the characters have their own plot lines that connect nicely with the [film's] original story," but said they eventually end up as "foils to build on the character of Z." Although Nakamura disapproved of the film's unresolved plotlines, he would declare that the film is "definitely well worth seeing for any fan of the series."

Home media
Z was released in Japan on June 28, 2013 on DVD and Blu-ray, with both formats having a regular edition and a limited "Greatest Armored Edition". The regular editions for both formats include trailers, with the first copies having one of nine randomly distributed holographic stickers of a straw hat. The limited editions for both formats include all nine straw hat holographic stickers, Zephyr's weapon Smasher as a keychain, a stand with a voice recording, and not-for-sale press material. The limited editions also has a bonus DVD which includes the prologue to the film, titled One Piece: Glorious Island, "event footage", and interviews. By the end of the year in Japan, it had sold 125,667 DVDs and 80,016 Blu-rays.

In the Philippines, Z was released on DVD and VCD by C-Interactive Digital Entertainment on October 17, 2013.

On April 7, 2014, Funimation announced its acquisition of the home video rights to the film in the United States and Canada. The film was released in a Blu-ray/DVD combo on September 30, 2014, which includes the English dub recorded by Funimation, promos for the film, and a video of Patrick Seitz at Sakura-Con in 2014.

Selecta Visión released the film in Spain on DVD and Blu-ray on November 30, 2016, featuring Japanese and Spanish audio, as well as subtitles in Spanish.

See also
 List of One Piece films
 List of One Piece media

Notes

References

External links

2012 anime films
Films directed by Tatsuya Nagamine
Z
Toei Animation films
Funimation
Films scored by Kohei Tanaka
Films scored by Shirō Hamaguchi